Wilmington Friends School is a private Preschool-12 school in unincorporated New Castle County, Delaware, United States, near Wilmington. It is affiliated with the Society of Friends, also known as the Quakers.

History 
The school was founded in 1748 by members of the Wilmington Monthly Meeting of Friends.

Of the school, Delaware historian Benjamin Ferris wrote in the 19th century, "Thousands of children have there received the first rudiments of an English education."

In 1937, the Friends School moved from its original site to its current location in Alapocas, just outside the city of Wilmington. In 2019, it was announced that the school was selling its lower school building and constructing a new lower school on the middle and upper school campus. The building and about 20 acres of property is planned to be sold to the pharmaceutical research company Incyte.

Notable alumni

Ashley Biden, American social worker, activist, philanthropist, and fashion designer
Adam B. Ellick, correspondent for The New York Times who filmed a documentary about Malala Yousafza
Linda Holmes, NPR personality and writer
Matt Meyer, New Castle County Executive
Crystal Nix-Hines, United States Ambassador to UNESCO
Daniel Pfeiffer, politician and podcaster
Carol Quillen, president of Davidson College
 Mabel Vernon, American suffragist, pacifist, and a national leader in the United States suffrage movement

References

External links 

Educational institutions established in 1748
High schools in New Castle County, Delaware
Private high schools in Delaware
Quaker schools in Delaware
Schools in New Castle County, Delaware
Private elementary schools in Delaware
Private middle schools in Delaware
Private K-12 schools in the United States
Preparatory schools in Delaware
1748 establishments in Delaware